Thandi Memela (8 January 1939 – 7 January 2021) was a South African politician from KwaZulu-Natal. A member of South Africa's African National Congress (ANC), she served as a Member of the National Assembly of South Africa from 2009 until 2019. She was also the inaugural Deputy President of the ANC Veterans' League between 2009 and 2017.

Memela died in 2021 at the age of 81.

References

1939 births
2021 deaths
African National Congress politicians
Members of the National Assembly of South Africa
Politicians from KwaZulu-Natal